Photovoice is a qualitative research method used in community-based participatory research to gather information. Photovoice uses participant photography to guide interviews, and is commonly used in the fields of community development, international development, public health, and education. According to the creators of the process, a photovoice project should aim to: (1) empower individuals to document and reflect on community assets and concerns, (2) invite critical dialogue and create knowledge about important community issues while using photographs as a medium for group discussion, (3) reach policymakers and stakeholders. Generally, photovoice participants attend basic photography training and then take photographs to respond to a prompt. Photos taken by participants are then used as reference material to guide a formal interview. One advantage of photovoice is that, unlike traditional interviews, it does not rely on verbal communication alone. Since photovoice enables participants to respond to an interview question non-verbally, with photographs, it can be used to overcome social, cultural and linguistic barriers to verbal communication. As a result, photovoice can be implemented with participants regardless of age, education level, language, gender, race, class, disability, etc. Photovoice can be used to gather new insights and perspectives that can raise awareness of hidden or overlooked issues and aspects of a given community.

Participants are asked to express their points of view or represent their communities by photographing scenes that highlight research themes. Common research themes include community concerns, community assets, social issues, and public health barriers. These photographs are collaboratively interpreted through discussions in both small and large groups, and narratives can be developed that explain how the photos highlight a particular research theme. These narratives are then used to promote dialogue to mobilize and help policymakers better understand and change the community, thereby developing effective solutions and programs that address the issues and needs.

Background
Photovoice was developed in 1992 by Caroline C. Wang of the University of Michigan, and Mary Ann Burris, Program Officer for Women's Health at the Ford Foundation headquartered in Beijing, China. The idea was built on the foundation that images and words together can effectively express community and individual needs, problems, and desires. In addition, photovoice was strongly influenced by documentary photography, the concept of empowerment, feminist theory, and Paulo Freire's Pedagogy of the Oppressed to promote health education and his idea of critical consciousness. Wang and Burris asserted that “Freire noted that one means of enabling people to think critically about their community, and to begin discussing the everyday social and political forces that influence their lives, was the visual image … Photovoice takes this concept one step further so that the images of the community are made by the people themselves.”

Photovoice was first used to empower the silenced rural women in Yunnan Province, China, to influence the policies and programs affecting them. Since then, the method has been used in different settings and populations, such as by refugees in San Diego seeking in–person medical interpretation options, by homeless adults in Ann Arbor, Michigan, by Dr. Claudia Mitchell to support community health workers and teachers in rural South Africa, and by Dr. Laura S. Lorenz of the Heller School for Social Policy and Management at Brandeis University in her work with brain injury survivors.

Modern implementation
In the 21st century, some university professors have used the photovoice model to teach social work students. In addition, it has been used as a tool to engage children and youth, giving them a safe environment and opportunity to communicate their concerns and coping strategies to policymakers and service providers. In other words, photovoice is used at all levels as a tool for self-development, sharing awareness, advocacy, research, needs assessment, monitoring, etc. So the use of photovoice allows one to capture and widen their perspective on all levels of various issues.

Variants
Also known as "participatory photography" or "photo novella", photovoice is considered a sub–type of "participatory visual methods" or picturevoice which includes techniques such as photo-elicitation and digital storytelling. These techniques allow research participants to create visuals that capture their individual perspectives as part of the research process. An example of this is found in Project Lives, a participatory photography project used to create a new image of project housing dwellers, published in April 2015. Two other forms of picturevoice include paintvoice, stemming from the work of Michael Yonas, and comicvoice, which has been pioneered by John Baird's Create a Comic Project since 2008, and to a lesser extent by Michael Bitz's Comic Book Project.

International development
In international research, photovoice has been seen to allow participants from the developing world to define how they want to be represented to the international community. The individuals are facilitated and given control to tell their stories and perspectives which empower them to be engaged and maintain a firm sense of authorship over their representations. This helps to convey a stereotype-free picture of what it means to live in a developing country to those supporting (i.e. funders and voters of the developed country) and doing international development (i.e. NGO and government agencies). In addition, photovoice allows the community to monitor the impact of the change created by development programs. This can help inform the outside agency about the process, true impacts (what is/isn't working and why), and complex reality, thus accompany wider and deeper research and analysis to improve the development progress.

See also 
Participatory art

References

Further reading

External links 
 PhotoVoice - The UK based charity that uses ethical photography to promote positive social change
 PhotovoiceWorldwide.com – information about photovoice projects and workshops coordinated by Brandeis faculty member Laura Lorenz

Community development
Educational research
Pedagogy
Photography by genre
Social research